Molione triacantha is a species of comb-footed spider in the family Theridiidae. It is found in India, China, Laos, Malaysia, Singapore, Taiwan.

References

Theridiidae
Spiders described in 1892